Mokkapati (Telugu: మొక్కపాటి) is one of the Indian surnames.
 Mokkapati Narasimha Sastry (1892–1973), Telugu language novelist
 Mokkapati Subbarayudu, Diwan of Maharajah of Pithapuram

Mukkapati is what the surname turned into 

Indian surnames